The Doubles race of the 2016 FIL World Luge Championships was held on 30 January 2016.

Results
The first run will be started at 12:48 and the final run at 14:02.

References

Doubles